Francis Xavier McCarthy (born February 15, 1942) is an American actor who has appeared in films such as Interstellar (2014) and Deep Impact (1998).

Filmography

References

External links

1942 births
Living people
American male film actors
American male television actors
20th-century American male actors
21st-century American male actors